Abdusalom Khasanov (Tajik:Абдусалом Ҳасанов) is an amateur boxer from Tajikistan.

Career
He competed at the 2001 World Amateur Boxing Championships, but was stopped in the round of 16.

He won a bronze medal at bantamweight at the 2002 Asian Games.

In the Featherweight (57 kg) division he won bronze at the 2003 World Amateur Boxing Championships in Bangkok.

References 

Year of birth missing (living people)
Living people
Asian Games medalists in boxing
Boxers at the 2002 Asian Games
Tajikistani male boxers
AIBA World Boxing Championships medalists
Asian Games bronze medalists for Tajikistan

Medalists at the 2002 Asian Games
Bantamweight boxers
Featherweight boxers